Alan Ogilvie may refer to:

 David Ogilvie (cricketer) (Alan David Ogilvie, born 1951), Australian cricketer 
 Alan Grant Ogilvie (1887–1954), Scottish geographer